Alexander Chapman is a Canadian actor. He is best known for his role as Lydie-Anne in Lilies, for which he garnered a Genie Award nomination for Best Supporting Actor at the 17th Genie Awards.

Chapman, who has also performed as a drag queen under the name Titty Galore, has also had supporting roles in Space Cases, Welcome to Africville, Fig Trees, After Alice, Jesus of Montreal, Queer as Folk, Sugar, The Kids in the Hall, Tru Love and Murder in Passing, often but not always playing a drag queen or a transgender woman.

He has also performed extensively in stage roles, including in Canadian Stage's production of Angels in America.

Filmography

Film

Television

References

External links

Canadian male film actors
Canadian male television actors
Canadian male stage actors
Black Canadian male actors
Canadian drag queens
Male actors from Montreal
Canadian gay actors
Living people
Canadian male web series actors
21st-century Canadian male actors
Black Canadian LGBT people
Year of birth missing (living people)
21st-century Canadian LGBT people